Estádio das Mangueiras is a football stadium located at the Dr. Agostinho Neto neighborhood in the city of Saurimo, Lunda Sul province, Angola.  The state-owned stadium is currently used mostly for football matches, on club level by Progresso da Lunda Sul of the Girabola. The stadium has a capacity of 7,000 spectators.

The stadium was renovated in 2012.

References

External links
Profile at girabola.com

Football venues in Angola
Lunda Sul Province